Goldamcheh (also Romanized as Goldāmcheh) is a village in Qotbabad Rural District, Kordian District, Jahrom County, Fars Province, Iran. At the 2006 census, its population was 557, in 125 families.

References 

Populated places in Jahrom County